The 2016 Zambia Super League is the 55th season of the Zambian Top League. The season began on 12 March 2016. ZESCO United are the defending champions, coming off their second consecutive title and fifth overall, all in the last nine years.

Teams locations

Zambian Premier League expanded from 16 to 18 teams for the 2016 season with two clubs relegated to Division One and four promoted. Konkola Blades and National Assembly were both relegated to Division One after finishing 15th and 16th, respectively, in the 2015 season. Kabwe Warriors, Lumwana Radiants, Lusaka Tigers and Mufulira Blackpool were each promoted from Division One.

League table

Positions by round

Top scorers

Hat-tricks

4 Player scored 4 goals.

References

Zambia
Zamboa
Football
Zambia Super League